James Tomio Saito (born March 6, 1955) is an American actor.

Saito is best known as the original Shredder in Teenage Mutant Ninja Turtles, Dr. Chen in the ABC series Eli Stone, Harry Kim in the Netflix film Always Be My Maybe, and Kenji on Modern Love. In 2020, Saito became a member of the Academy of Motion Picture Arts and Sciences.

Early life
Saito was born in Los Angeles to Japanese parents. He graduated from University of California, Los Angeles with a degree in theater. He later studied acting with actress Uta Hagen at HB Studios, located in New York City.

He was in the last group of students who studied with Sanford Meisner on the island of Bequia in the Grenadines and then continued with Meisner in North Hollywood.

Career

Saito also appeared in the movies Life of Pi, Big Eyes, Wilson, While We're Young, I Think I Love My Wife, The Thomas Crown Affair, The Devil's Advocate, Henry Fool, Home Alone 3, Pearl Harbor, Die Hard with a Vengeance, and Hot Dog…The Movie.

Saito's TV credits include Grey's Anatomy, Altered Carbon, Prodigal Son, Broad City, At Home with Amy Sedaris, Elementary, Instinct, Iron Fist, The Deuce, Paterno, House of Cards, Madam Secretary, Hawaii Five-0, Person of Interest, 30 Rock, One Life to Live, Too Big to Fail, Blue Bloods, Rubicon, The Unit, Heroes and Villains as Tokugawa Ieyasu, As the World Turns, Law & Order: Criminal Intent, Sex and the City, The Young and the Restless, Blood & Orchids, MacGyver, Hart to Hart, The Greatest American Hero, The Incredible Hulk, M*A*S*H, Law & Order, Miami Vice, and Farewell to Manzanar.

Saito has worked extensively in theater, including the Broadway productions of The King and I (1997) and David Henry Hwang's Golden Child (1998). Off-Broadway plays include Sarah Ruhl's The Oldest Boy (2014) at the Mitzi Newhouse Theater at Lincoln Center and Julia Cho's Durango at The Public Theater for which he won an Obie award in 2007. He also appeared in the Off-Broadway production Greater Clements in 2019.

Saito appeared as Bob Lin in the film Love Hard, released in November 2021 by Netflix.

Filmography

Film

Television

References

External links 

1955 births
American male film actors
American male television actors
American male voice actors
Living people
Obie Award recipients
Male actors from Los Angeles
American male actors of Japanese descent
American film actors of Asian descent
20th-century American male actors
21st-century American male actors